James Benjamin (born 21 February 1994) is a Welsh rugby union player who plays for the Dragons regional team as a hooker. He is a Wales U20 and Wales 7s international.

Club career 
Benjamin began his career in the back row, capable of playing as a flanker or number 8. A member of the Dragons academy, Benjamin also played for feeder clubs  Cross Keys RFC and Bedwas RFC. Benjamin made his competitive debut for the Dragons in 2013, against the Wasps.

In 2020, Benjamin began a conversion from back row to hooker. He spent time on loan with Cornish Pirates and Hartpury University R.F.C. to gain experience in the position. He made his first competitive start for the Dragons at hooker on 27 November 2022 against the Lions.

International career 
Benjamin represented Wales U20 for two seasons, playing in the Six Nations Under 20s Championship and World Rugby Under 20 Championship.

Benjamin has also featured for Wales Sevens, and was included in the squad for the 2018 Commonwealth Games.

References

External links 
Dragons profile

Rugby union players from Newport, Wales
Welsh rugby union players
Dragons RFC players
Bedwas RFC players
Cross Keys RFC players
Living people
1994 births
Rugby union hookers
Rugby union flankers
Rugby union number eights
Cornish Pirates players